103.2 Dublin City FM (Previously: Anna Livia FM and Dublin City Anna Livia FM) is an Independent Local Radio station in Dublin, Ireland,  operated by Dublin Public Service Radio Association Ltd, under a sound broadcasting contract from the Broadcasting Authority of Ireland. The station broadcasts on the 103.2 MHz FM frequency. Dublin City FM's Broadcast tower is located on "Rock Solid" tower on Three Rock Mountain, Co.Dublin. Dublin City FM is Ireland's only special interest, arts and cultural radio station.

History
The station's first broadcast was from Grafton Street, Dublin in 1992. Since 1992, the station has moved several times including to Griffith College and Sheriff Street. However the station has been situated in Dublin's Dockland's since 2001. Former members of the Dublin City FM team include: Robbie Fogarty - Sunshine 106.8, Declan Carty - Newstalk, Dermot Whelan - Today FM, Brian Lally - RTÉ and many more.

In 2001 The station was renamed to "Dublin City Anna Livia FM" due to its connection and funding from Dublin City Council. In December 2007 The station was renamed "103.2 Dublin City FM" for advertising and branding purposes.

In 2008, Chris Maher, Presenter of "The Soul Kitchen" won a "Living Dublin Award" because of the innovation he showed when setting up the Dublin City Soul Festival.  On 6 May 2008 Mick Hanley was elected as C.E.O of Dublin City FM.

In March 2009, Chris Maher of "The Soul Kitchen" and Sean Brophy of "Jazzorama" moved to 4fm, a new multi-city radio station for Ireland.
Both of these presenters have re-joined the Dublin City FM line-up with Jazz Mine ( Saturdays 5PM ) and Midweek Music Miscellany ( Wednesday morning 11.30 ) presented and produced by Sean Brophy while The Soul Kitchen ( with Chris Maher ) airs Thursdays at 10PM.

Programming
The station broadcasts special interest music and talk, to an older Dublin. Its flagship is Live Drive, broadcast from 7 to 10 am and 4 to 7 pm. Other programmes include Good Morning Dublin and Black Echoes, broadcasting since 1982 in various stations. Dublin City FM in 2008 took on a syndicated show called  Little Steven's Underground Garage and as a result Tower Records now have a section dedicated to the show and genre of music.

Dublin City FM broadcast traffic info every weekday morning and weekday evening on their Live Drive programme. In association with the Dublin City Council traffic monitoring network, broadcasters monitor and analyse over 150 cameras around the city with a view to helping listeners avoid traffic and find parking. They play "Dublin's best mix of music" and ensure listeners they avoid traffic-jams on Ireland's only dedicated traffic show. The station broadcasts 7 days a week from 07:00 - 02:00. Programmes Include: Current affairs, documentaries, Dublin issues, the arts, literature, business, health, media matters, sport, nature, leisure activities, women's topics, local history, plus special interest Irish and world music.

Notable former staff
Denzil Lacey - Currently works with Spin South West
Nuala Carey - Currently works with RTÉ Weather
Robbie Fogarty - Currently works with Sunshine 106.8 and Classic Hits 4FM

See also
 Dublin City Council

External links
Dublin City FM website

Radio stations in the Republic of Ireland